Grazing is a method of feeding in which a herbivore feeds on low-growing plants such as grasses or other multicellular organisms, such as algae. Many species of animals can be said to be grazers, from large animals such as hippopotamuses to small aquatic snails. Grazing behaviour is a type of feeding strategy within the ecology of a species. Specific grazing strategies include graminivory (eating grasses); coprophagy (producing part-digested pellets which are reingested); pseudoruminant (having a multi-chambered stomach but not chewing the cud); and grazing on plants other than grass, such as on marine algae.

Grazing's ecological effects can include redistributing nutrients, keeping grasslands open or favouring a particular species over another.

Ecology

Many small selective herbivores follow larger grazers which skim off the highest, tough growth of grasses, exposing tender shoots. For terrestrial animals, grazing is normally distinguished from browsing in that grazing is eating grass or forbs, whereas browsing is eating woody twigs and leaves from trees and shrubs. Grazing differs from predation because the organism being grazed upon may not be killed. It differs from parasitism because the two organisms live together in a constant state of physical externality (i.e. low intimacy). Water animals that feed by rasping algae and other micro-organisms from stones are called grazers–scrapers.

Graminivory

Graminivory is a form of grazing involving feeding primarily on grass (specifically "true" grasses in the Poaceae). Horses, cattle, capybara, hippopotamuses, grasshoppers, geese, and giant pandas are graminivores. Giant pandas (Ailuropoda melanoleuca) are obligate bamboo grazers, 99% of their diet consisting of sub-alpine bamboo species.

Coprophagy

Rabbits are herbivores that feed by grazing on grass, forbs, and leafy weeds. They graze heavily and rapidly for about the first half-hour of a grazing period (usually in the late afternoon), followed by about half an hour of more selective feeding. If the environment is relatively non-threatening, the rabbit remains outdoors for many hours, grazing at intervals. Their diet contains large amounts of cellulose, which is hard to digest. Rabbits solve this problem by using a form of hindgut fermentation. They pass two distinct types of feces: hard droppings and soft black viscous pellets, the latter of which are known as caecotrophs and are immediately eaten (coprophagy). Rabbits reingest their own droppings (rather than chewing the cud as do cattle and many other grazers) to digest their food further and extract sufficient nutrients.

Capybara (Hydrochoerus hydrochaeris) are herbivores that graze mainly on grasses and aquatic plants, as well as fruit and tree bark. As with other grazers, they can be very selective, feeding on the leaves of one species and disregarding other species surrounding it. They eat a greater variety of plants during the dry season, as fewer plants are available. While they eat grass during the wet season, they have to switch to more abundant reeds during the dry season. The capybara's jaw hinge is not perpendicular; hence, it chews food by grinding back-and-forth rather than side-to-side. Capybara are coprophagous as a means of obtaining bacterial gut flora to help digest the cellulose in the grass that forms their normal diet, and to extract the maximum protein and vitamins from their food. They may also regurgitate food to masticate again, similar to cud-chewing by a cow. As with other rodents, the front teeth of capybara grow continually to compensate for the constant wear from eating grasses; their cheek teeth also grow continuously.

Pseudoruminant

The hippopotamus is a large, semi-aquatic, mammal inhabiting rivers, lakes and mangrove swamps. During the day, they remain cool by staying in the water or mud; reproduction and childbirth both occur in water. They emerge at dusk to graze on grasses. While hippopotamuses rest near each other in the water, grazing is a solitary activity. Their incisors can be as long as 40 cm and the canines up to 50 cm; however, the canines and incisors are used for combat, and play no role in feeding. Hippos rely on their broad, horny lips to grasp and pull grasses which are then ground by the molars. The hippo is considered to be a pseudoruminant; it has a complex three- or four-chambered stomach but does not "chew cud".

Non-grass grazing

Although grazing is typically associated with mammals feeding on grasslands, ecologists sometimes use the word in a broader sense, to include any organism that feeds on any other species without ending the life of the prey organism. Use of the term "grazing" varies further; for example, a marine biologist may describe herbivorous sea urchins that feed on kelp as grazers, even when they kill the organism by cutting the plant at the base. Malacologists sometimes apply the word to aquatic snails that feed by consuming the microscopic film of algae, diatoms and detritus—a biofilm—that covers the substrate and other surfaces underwater. In marine ecosystems, grazing by mesograzers such as some crustaceans maintains habitat structure by preventing algal overgrowth, especially in coral reefs.

Benefits

Environmental

Grazer urine and feces "recycle nitrogen, phosphorus, potassium and other plant nutrients and return them to the soil". Grazing can allow for the accumulation of organic matter which may help to combat soil erosion. This acts as nutrition for insects and organisms found within the soil. These organisms "aid in carbon sequestration and water filtration".

Biodiversity

When grass is grazed, dead litter grass is reduced which is advantageous for birds such as waterfowl. Grazing can increase biodiversity. Without grazing, many of the same grasses grow, for example brome and bluegrass, consequently producing a monoculture.

References

External links 

Ethology
Herbivory
Land use